Purnagad Fort is a fort located 25 km from Ratnagiri, in Ratnagiri district, of Maharashtra. This fort is very small but an important fort in Ratnagiri district for Kanhoji Angre's Navy that evolved as the modern Indian Navy. The Fort is spread over 22 acres and located on a northern hill on Muchkundi River.

History
The fort is known as one of the bases of Kanhoji Angre's ports. It was used to defend and raid British forces and used for trade with other Europeans. According to some people, it was constructed by the king Shivaji while others give credit to maratha Admiral Kanhoji Angre. This fort exacted less revenue during Peshwa regime.

Places to see
The fort is built using the Black basalt rock and is rectangular in shape. There is a Maruti Idol at the entrance gate. On the entrance gate, Sun-Moon and Ganapati are carved in the stone. Inside the fort is a Holy Basil stand and ruins of the buildings. The other gate opens on the sea side with wonderful view. There are steps to climb a decent height where the Flag stands with a delightful view of ocean and Purnagad Beach that have a history of a firm reign of Kanhoji Angre's Naval powers.

See also
 List of forts in Maharashtra
 List of forts in India
 Maritime history of Europe
 Shivaji
 Marathi People
 Portuguese India
 Maratha Navy
 List of Maratha dynasties and states
 Maratha War of Independence
 Battles involving the Maratha Empire
 Maratha Army
 Maratha titles
 Military history of India
 List of people involved in the Maratha Empire

References

Buildings and structures of the Maratha Empire
Forts in Ratnagiri district
16th-century forts in India
Tourist attractions in Konkan
Former populated places in India